The women's sprint competition at the 2018 UEC European Track Championships was held on 4 and 5 August 2018.

Results

Qualifying
Top 10 riders qualify for 1/8 finals, 11th to 22nd places qualify for 1/16 finals.

1/16 finals
Heat winners advanced to the 1/8 finals.

1/8 finals
Heat winners advanced to the quarterfinals.

Quarterfinals
Matches are extended to a best-of-three format hereon; winners proceed to the semifinals.

Semifinals
Winners proceed to the gold medal final; losers proceed to the bronze medal final.

Finals

References 

Women's sprint
European Track Championships – Women's sprint
Euro